Carrie Mac (born February 25, 1975) is a Canadian author of more than a dozen novels for Young Adults, both contemporary and speculative. Her latest work is the literary novel, LAST WINTER, due out from Random House Canada in early 2023. She also writes literary short fiction, and creative non-fiction.
Some of her accolades include a CBC Creative Nonfiction Prize, the Sheila A. Egoff Children's Literature Prize, and the Arthur Ellis Award, as well as various other awards and recognitions.

Early life, education, and employment
Mac was born in Kamloops, British Columbia. During her childhood and youth, Mac lived in Vancouver, Grand Forks, Abbotsford and on the Sunshine Coast.

Mac's first job, at age seven, was to read the Bible to an ex-Son of Freedom; she was paid a quarter a page. Mac dropped out of high school in Grade eleven, completing her secondary education by correspondence. She trained as a paramedic at the Justice Institute of British Columbia. Mac also worked at various times as a sign language interpreter, a bookstore clerk, and a child and youth advocate in a transition house.

Influences and inspiration
A self-confessed bookaholic, Mac credits Louise Fitzhugh, author of Harriet the Spy, with the realization of "what kind of power words carry, and how they can be used to sharpen your own identity and injure others." Other influences include: Anne Cameron, Margaret Atwood, Alice Munro. Mac explains that Raymond Carver showed her that "the lives of working class people (my people) are filled with stories worth writing about too, and that you don't need to go on and on and on and on to relate human emotions when you can nail it down so adroitly with less."

Writing for reluctant readers
Pain and Wastings, Jacked, Charmed, and Crush were written for Orca Book Publisher for the Soundings Series. The Soundings series is written specifically for reluctant or difficult to engage readers, also known as hi-lo readers (high interest, low reading level). It features contemporary themes, often including what might be considered controversial material and language.

Portrayal of queer characters
All of Mac's YA novels have queer, gay or questioning characters. She says of her work "I know for myself that I can't leave queer characters out of my writing, even if they're gay and only I know it, or I don't spell it out."

Critical reception
Quill and Quire describe Mac as a "powerhouse" and her novel The Opposite of Tidy as "irresistible and not to be missed." C.J. Bott, in VOYA, said of The Beckoners, "The powerful intensity in this book will either keep the reader riveted or forced to take breaks from the haunting discomfort."

"Mac's experience as a paramedic gives her portrayal of their work an easy authority, and she sketches Ethan and his group home with a certain amount of precision and humour. The fluidity of the storytelling, as well as the dramatic circumstances of the story, are likely to attract Orca Soundings readers."

Mac's book Charmed, about a girl who is trapped into prostitution, was banned by the Plano Independent School District in Texas, in 2006/2007. The book "was challenged due to profanity, sexual content and violence." However, according to Dave Jenkinson, Professor Emeritus, Faculty of Education, the University of Manitoba, "Mac's authentic treatment of her subject matter carries through to the book's conclusion… Charmed is the gold standard of what hi-lo titles can be. Highly Recommended."

Personal life
Mac lives in Vancouver with her children. She is a queer mom and attachment parent.

Books
Triskelia trilogy:
The Droughtlanders (2006)
Retribution (2007)
Storm (2008)
Standalone works:
The Beckoners (2004)
The Gryphon Project  (2010)
The Opposite of Tidy (2011) 
10 Things I Can See From Here (2017)
Wildfire (2020)
Orca Soundings:
Charmed (2004)
Crush (2006) 
Pain and Wastings (2008)
Jacked (2009)
The Way Back (2014)

Awards
 Canadian Council for the Arts grants (2000, 2003, 2004 & 2008) 
 Arthur Ellis Award: Best Young Adult Crime Book (2005)
 Canadian Library Association Honour Book (2005)
 International Children's and Youth Literature White Raven list (2005) for The Beckoners
 International Reading Association Young Adult Choices list (2006) for The Beckoners 
 Young Adult Canadian Book Award Honour Book (2007) for  The Droughtlanders 
 Sunburst Award shortlist in young-adult category (2007) for The Beckoners  and (2008) for Retribution 
 Stellar Book Award nomination (2009) for The Droughtlanders
 Sheila A. Egoff Book Prize (2010) for The Gryphon Project
 Canadian Library Association Young-Adult Honor Book selection (2010) for The Gryphon Project
 CBC Non-fiction Literary Prize (2015)

Notes

External links
Carri Mac Official Website
Orca Soundings
CBC Literary Prizes

1975 births
Living people
Canadian children's writers
Canadian women novelists
Canadian writers of young adult literature
Canadian women short story writers
Canadian LGBT novelists
Lesbian novelists
Queer novelists
Canadian women children's writers
People from Kamloops
Writers from British Columbia
Women writers of young adult literature
21st-century Canadian novelists
21st-century Canadian LGBT people